Steve Swindel may refer to:

Steve Swindells (born 1952), English singer-songwriter
Steve Swindal, American businessman
Steve Swindall (born 1982), Scottish former rugby union footballer